

Events

Pre-1600

1154 – Henry II of England is crowned at Westminster Abbey.
1187 – Pope Clement III is elected.
1490 – Anne, Duchess of Brittany, is married to Maximilian I, Holy Roman Emperor by proxy.
1562 – The Battle of Dreux takes place during the French Wars of Religion.

1601–1900
1675 – The Great Swamp Fight, a pivotal battle in King Philip's War, gives the English settlers a bitterly won victory.
1776 – Thomas Paine publishes one of a series of pamphlets in The Pennsylvania Journal entitled "The American Crisis".
1777 – American Revolutionary War: George Washington's Continental Army goes into winter quarters at Valley Forge, Pennsylvania.
1783 – William Pitt the Younger becomes the youngest Prime Minister of the United Kingdom at 24.
1796 – French Revolutionary Wars: Two British frigates under Commodore Horatio Nelson and two Spanish frigates under Commodore Don Jacobo Stuart engage in battle off the coast of Murcia.
1828 – Vice President of the United States John C. Calhoun sparks the Nullification Crisis when he anonymously publishes the South Carolina Exposition and Protest, protesting the Tariff of 1828.
1900 – Hopetoun Blunder: The first Governor-General of Australia John Hope, 7th Earl of Hopetoun, appoints Sir William Lyne premier of the new state of New South Wales, but he is unable to persuade other colonial politicians to join his government and is forced to resign.
1900 – French parliament votes amnesty for all involved in scandalous army treason trial known as Dreyfus affair.

1901–present
1907 – Two hundred thirty-nine coal miners die in the Darr Mine Disaster in Jacobs Creek, Pennsylvania.
1912 – William Van Schaick, captain of the steamship  which caught fire and killed over one thousand people, is pardoned by U.S. President William Howard Taft after  years in Sing Sing prison.
1920 – King Constantine I is restored as King of the Hellenes after the death of his son Alexander of Greece and a plebiscite.
1924 – The last Rolls-Royce Silver Ghost is sold in London, England.
  1924   – German serial killer Fritz Haarmann is sentenced to death for a series of murders.
1927 – Three Indian revolutionaries, Ram Prasad Bismil, Roshan Singh and Ashfaqulla Khan, are executed by the British Raj for participation in the Kakori conspiracy.
1929 – The Indian National Congress promulgates the Purna Swaraj (the Declaration of the Independence of India).
1932 – BBC World Service begins broadcasting as the BBC Empire Service.
1940 – Risto Ryti, the Prime Minister of Finland,  is elected President of the Republic of Finland in a presidential election, which is exceptionally held by the 1937 electoral college.
1941 – World War II: Adolf Hitler appoints himself as head of the Oberkommando des Heeres.
1945 – John Amery, British Fascist, is executed at the age of 33 by the British Government for treason.
1946 – Start of the First Indochina War.
1956 – Irish-born physician John Bodkin Adams is arrested in connection with the suspicious deaths of more than 160 patients. Eventually he is convicted only of minor charges.
1961 – India annexes Daman and Diu, part of Portuguese India.
1967 – Harold Holt, the Prime Minister of Australia, is officially presumed dead.
1972 – Apollo program: The last crewed lunar flight, Apollo 17, carrying Eugene Cernan, Ronald Evans, and Harrison Schmitt, returns to Earth.
1974 – Nelson Rockefeller is sworn in as Vice President of the United States under President Gerald Ford under the provisions of the 25th Amendment to the United States Constitution.
1977 – The  5.8 Bob–Tangol earthquake strikes Kerman Province in Iran, destroying villages and killing 665 people.
1981 – Sixteen lives are lost when the Penlee lifeboat goes to the aid of the stricken coaster Union Star in heavy seas.
1983 – The original FIFA World Cup trophy, the Jules Rimet Trophy, is stolen from the headquarters of the Brazilian Football Confederation in Rio de Janeiro, Brazil.
1984 – The Sino-British Joint Declaration, stating that China would resume the exercise of sovereignty over Hong Kong and the United Kingdom would restore Hong Kong to China with effect from July 1, 1997, is signed in Beijing by Deng Xiaoping and Margaret Thatcher.
1986 – Mikhail Gorbachev, leader of the Soviet Union, releases Andrei Sakharov and his wife from exile in Gorky.
1991 – Joe Cole, American roadie and author, is killed in an armed robbery
1995 – The United States Government restores federal recognition to the Nottawaseppi Huron Band of Potawatomi Native American tribe.
1997 – SilkAir Flight 185 crashes into the Musi River, near Palembang in Indonesia, killing 104.
1998 – President Bill Clinton is impeached by the United States House of Representatives, becoming the second president of the United States to be impeached.
2000 – The Leninist Guerrilla Units wing of the Communist Labour Party of Turkey/Leninist attack a Nationalist Movement Party office in Istanbul, Turkey, killing one person and injuring three.
  2001   – Argentine economic crisis: December riots: Riots erupt in Buenos Aires, Argentina.
2012 – Park Geun-hye is elected the first female president of South Korea.
2013 – Spacecraft Gaia is launched by European Space Agency.
2016 – Russian ambassador to Turkey Andrei Karlov is assassinated while at an art exhibition in Ankara. The assassin, Mevlüt Mert Altıntaş, is shot and killed by a Turkish guard. 
  2016   – A vehicular attack in Berlin, Germany, kills and injures multiple people at a Christmas market.

Births

Pre-1600

1343 – William I, Margrave of Meissen (d. 1407)
1498 – Andreas Osiander, German Protestant theologian (d. 1552)
1554 – Philip William, Prince of Orange (d. 1618)
1587 – Dorothea Sophia, Abbess of Quedlinburg (d. 1645)

1601–1900
1683 – Philip V of Spain (d. 1746)
1699 – William Bowyer, English printer (d. 1777)
1714 – John Winthrop, American astronomer and educator (d. 1779)
1778 – Marie Thérèse of France (d. 1851)
1796 – Manuel Bretón de los Herreros, Spanish poet, playwright, and critic (d. 1873)
1797 – Antoine Louis Dugès, French obstetrician and naturalist (d. 1838)
1817 – James J. Archer, American lawyer and general (d. 1864)
1820 – Mary Livermore, American journalist and activist (d. 1905)
1825 – George Frederick Bristow, American violinist and composer (d. 1898)
1831 – Bernice Pauahi Bishop, American philanthropist (d. 1884)
1849 – Henry Clay Frick, American businessman and financier (d. 1919)
1852 – Albert Abraham Michelson, Prussian-American physicist, chemist, and academic, Nobel Prize laureate (d. 1931)
1853 – Charles Fitzpatrick, Canadian lawyer and politician, 12th Lieutenant-Governor of Quebec (d. 1942)
1861 – Italo Svevo, Italian author and playwright (d. 1928)
1863 – Wallace Bryant, American archer (d. 1953)
1865 – Minnie Maddern Fiske, American actress and playwright (d. 1932)
1873 – Alphonse Kirchhoffer, French fencer (d. 1913)
1875 – Mileva Marić, Serbian physicist (d. 1948)
  1875   – Carter G. Woodson, American historian and author, founded Black History Month (d. 1950)
  1875   – Grace Marie Bareis, American mathematician (d. 1962)
1876 – Bernard Friedberg, Austrian-Israeli scholar and author (d. 1961)
1884 – Antonín Zápotocký, Czech politician, President of the Czechoslovak Socialist Republic (d. 1957)
1888 – Fritz Reiner, Hungarian-American conductor (d. 1963)
1891 – Edward Bernard Raczyński, Polish politician and diplomat, 4th President-in-exile of Poland (d. 1993)
1894 – Ford Frick, American journalist and businessman (d. 1978)
1895 – Ingeborg Refling Hagen, Norwegian author and educator (d. 1989)
1899 – Martin Luther King Sr., American pastor, missionary, and activist (d. 1984)

1901–present
1901 – Rudolf Hell, German engineer, invented the Hellschreiber (d. 2002)
  1901   – Oliver La Farge, American anthropologist and author (d. 1963)
  1901   – Fritz Mauruschat, German footballer and manager (d. 1974)
1902 – Ralph Richardson, English actor (d. 1983)
1903 – George Davis Snell, American geneticist and immunologist, Nobel Prize laureate (d. 1996)
1905 – Irving Kahn, American businessman (d. 2015)
  1905   – Giovanni Lurani, Italian race car driver, engineer, and journalist (d. 1995)
1906 – Leonid Brezhnev, Ukrainian-Russian marshal, engineer, and politician, 4th Head of State of the Soviet Union (d. 1982)
1907 – Jimmy McLarnin, Irish-American boxer, actor, and golfer (d. 2004)
1909 – W. A. Criswell, American pastor and author (d. 2002)
1910 – Jean Genet, French novelist, playwright, and poet (d. 1986)
1914 – Mel Shaw, American animator and screenwriter (d. 2012)
1915 – Édith Piaf, French singer-songwriter and actress (d. 1963)
  1915   – Claudia Testoni, Italian hurdler, sprinter, and long jumper (d. 1998)
1916 – Roy Ward Baker, English director and producer (d. 2010)
  1916   – Elisabeth Noelle-Neumann, German political scientist, journalist, and academic (d. 2010)
1918 – Professor Longhair, American singer-songwriter and pianist (d. 1980)
  1918   – Lee Rich, American producer and production manager (d. 2012)
1920 – Little Jimmy Dickens, American singer-songwriter and guitarist (d. 2015)
  1920   – David Susskind, American talk show host and producer (d. 1987)
1922 – Eamonn Andrews, Irish radio and television host (d. 1987)
1923 – Robert V. Bruce, American historian and author (d. 2008)
  1923   – Gordon Jackson, Scottish-English actor and singer (d. 1990)
1924 – Carlo Chiti, Italian engineer (d. 1994)
  1924   – Doug Harvey, Canadian ice hockey player and coach (d. 1989)
  1924   – Gary Morton, American comedian and producer (d. 1999)
  1924   – Edmund Purdom, British-Italian actor (d. 2009)
  1924   – Michel Tournier, French journalist and author (d. 2016)
  1924   – Cicely Tyson, American actress (d. 2021) 
1925 – Tankred Dorst, German author and playwright (d. 2017)
  1925   – William Schutz, American psychologist and academic (d. 2002)
  1925   – Robert B. Sherman, American songwriter and screenwriter (d. 2012)
1926 – Bobby Layne, American football player and coach (d. 1986)
  1926   – Fikret Otyam, Turkish painter and journalist (d. 2015)
1927 – James Booth, English actor and screenwriter (d. 2005)
1928 – Eve Bunting, Irish-American author and academic
  1928   – Nathan Oliveira, American painter and sculptor (d. 2010)
1929 – Bob Brookmeyer, American trombonist, pianist, and composer (d. 2011)
  1929   – David Douglas, 12th Marquess of Queensberry, Scottish potter
  1929   – Gregory Carroll, American singer-songwriter and producer (d. 2013)
  1929   – Howard Sackler, American playwright and screenwriter (d. 1982)
1930 – Wally Olins, English businessman and academic (d. 2014)
  1930   – Knut Helle, Norwegian historian and professor (d. 2015)
1931 –  Ginger Stanley, American model, actress and stunt woman
1932 – Salvador Elizondo, Mexican author, poet, playwright, and critic (d. 2006)
  1932   – Lola Hendricks, African American civil rights activist (d. 2013)
  1932   – Wayne Tippit, American actor (d. 2009)
1933 – Kevan Gosper, Australian runner and politician
  1933   – Christopher Smout, Scottish historian and academic
1934 – Al Kaline, American baseball player and sportscaster (d. 2020)
  1934   – Pratibha Patil, Indian lawyer and politician, 12th President of India
  1934   – Casper R. Taylor, Jr., American lawyer and politician
1935 – Bobby Timmons, American pianist and composer (d. 1974)
  1935   – Joanne Weaver, American baseball player (d. 2000)
  1935   – Tony Taylor, Cuban baseball player (d. 2020)
1940 – Phil Ochs, American singer-songwriter and guitarist (d. 1976)
1941 – Lee Myung-bak, South Korean businessman and politician, 10th President of South Korea
  1941   – Maurice White, American singer-songwriter and producer (d. 2016)
1942 – Cornell Dupree, American guitarist (d. 2011)
  1942   – "Mean Gene" Okerlund, American sports announcer (d. 2019)
1943 – Ross M. Lence, American political scientist and academic (d. 2006)
  1943   – James L. Jones, American general and politician, 22nd United States National Security Advisor
1944 – William Christie, American-French harpsichord player and conductor 
  1944   – Mitchell Feigenbaum, American physicist and mathematician (d. 2019)
  1944   – Martin Hume Johnson, English physiologist and academic
  1944   – Richard Leakey, Kenyan paleontologist and politician (d. 2022)
  1944   – Alvin Lee, English singer-songwriter and guitarist  (d. 2013)
  1944   – Tim Reid, American actor and director
  1944   – Steve Tyrell, American singer-songwriter and producer
  1944   – Zal Yanovsky, Canadian singer-songwriter and guitarist (d. 2002)
1945 – Elaine Joyce, American actress, singer, and dancer
  1945   – John McEuen, American singer-songwriter and guitarist 
1946 – Rosemary Conley, English businesswoman, author, and broadcaster
  1946   – Robert Urich, American actor and producer (d. 2002)
1947 – Jimmy Bain, Scottish bass player and songwriter (d. 2016)
1948 – Ken Brown, Canadian ice hockey player and sportscaster (d. 2022)
1949 – Orna Berry, Israeli computer scientist and businesswoman
  1949   – Claudia Kolb, American swimmer
  1949   – Sebastian, Danish singer-songwriter and guitarist
1950 – Eleanor J. Hill, American lawyer and diplomat
1951 – Mohammad Reza Aref, Iranian engineer and politician, 2nd Vice President of Iran
  1951   – Alan Rouse, English mountaineer and author (d. 1986)
1952 – Walter Murphy, American pianist and composer
1954 – Jeff Allam, English race car driver
  1954   – Tim Parks, English author and translator
1955 – Lincoln Hall, Australian mountaineer and author (d. 2012)
  1955   – Rob Portman, American lawyer and politician
1956 – Phil Harris, American captain and fisherman (d. 2010)
  1956   – Tom Lawless, American baseball player and manager
  1956   – Shane McEntee, Irish farmer and politician, Minister of State at the Department of Agriculture, Food and the Marine (d. 2012)
1957 – Cyril Collard, French actor, director, and composer (d. 1993)
  1957   – Kevin McHale, American basketball player, coach, and manager
1958 – Steven Isserlis, English cellist and author
  1958   – Limahl, English pop singer
1959 – Iván Vallejo, Ecuadorian mountaineer
  1959   – Lisa Wilkinson, Australian television host and journalist
1960 – Derrick Jensen, American author and activist
  1960   – Michelangelo Signorile, American journalist and author
1961 – Eric Allin Cornell, American physicist and academic, Nobel Prize laureate
  1961   – Matthew Waterhouse, English actor and author
  1961   – Reggie White, American football player and wrestler (d. 2004)
1962 – Gary Fleder, American director, producer, and screenwriter
1963 – Jennifer Beals, American model and actress 
  1963   – Til Schweiger, German actor, director, and producer
1964 – Béatrice Dalle, French actress
  1964   – Lorie Kane, Canadian golfer
  1964   – Randall McDaniel, American football player
  1964   – Arvydas Sabonis, Lithuanian basketball player
1965 – Chito Martínez, Belizean-American baseball player
1966 – Chuckii Booker, American singer-songwriter and producer
  1966   – Rajesh Chauhan, Indian cricketer
  1966   – Alberto Tomba, Italian skier
  1966   – Eric Weinrich, American ice hockey player and coach
1967 – Criss Angel, American magician 
  1967   – Charles Austin, American high jumper
1968 – Kristina Keneally, American-Australian politician, 42nd Premier of New South Wales
  1968   – Ken Marino, American actor, director, producer, and screenwriter
1969 – Michael Bates, American sprinter and football player
  1969   – Tom Gugliotta, American basketball player
  1969   – Richard Hammond, English journalist and producer
  1969   – Nayan Mongia, Indian cricketer
  1969   – Aziza Mustafa Zadeh, Azerbaijani composer, pianist, and singer
1970 – Tyson Beckford, American model and actor
1971 – Karen Pickering, English swimmer
  1971   – Amy Locane, American television and film actress
1972 – Alyssa Milano, American actress and television personality
  1972   – Warren Sapp, American football player and analyst
1973 – Michalis Grigoriou, Greek footballer and coach
  1973   – Erick Wainaina, Kenyan runner
  1973   – Zulfiya Zabirova, Russian cyclist
1974 – Eduard Ivakdalam, Indonesian footballer
  1974   – Joe Jurevicius, American football player
  1974   – Felipe Lopez, Dominican-American basketball player
  1974   – Jake Plummer, American football player and sportscaster
  1974   – Ricky Ponting, Australian cricketer and sportscaster
1975 – Makis Belevonis, Greek footballer
  1975   – Brandon Sanderson, American author and academic
  1975   – Jeremy Soule, Canadian composer
  1975   – Olivier Tébily, Ivorian-French footballer
  1975   – Dean Treister, Australian rugby league player
1977 – Jorge Garbajosa, Spanish basketball player
  1977   – LaTasha Jenkins, American sprinter
  1977   – Irina Voronina, Russian model
1978 – Patrick Casey, American actor, producer, and screenwriter
1979 – Kevin Devine, American singer-songwriter and guitarist 
  1979   – Rafael Soriano, Dominican baseball player
1980 – Jake Gyllenhaal, American actor and producer
  1980   – Marla Sokoloff, American actress and musician
1981 – Grégory Dufer, Belgian footballer
1982 – Mo Williams, American basketball player
1983 – Nektarios Alexandrou, Cypriot footballer
  1983   – Casey Crescenzo, American singer-songwriter and guitarist 
  1983   – Bridget Phillipson, English politician
  1983   – Laura Pomeroy, Canadian swimmer
  1983   – Matt Stajan, Canadian ice hockey player
1984 – Ian Kennedy, American baseball player
1985 – Gary Cahill, English footballer
  1985   – Andrea Baldini, Italian fencer
  1985   – Neil Kilkenny, English-Australian footballer
  1985   – Sally Kipyego, Kenyan runner
  1985   – Dan Logan, English bass player 
  1985   – Lady Sovereign, English rapper
1986 – Calvin Andrew, English footballer
  1986   – Ryan Babel, Dutch footballer
  1986   – Ingrid Burley, American rapper and songwriter
  1986   – Lazaros Christodoulopoulos, Greek footballer
  1986   – Zuzana Hejnová, Czech hurdler
  1986   – Miguel Lopes, Portuguese footballer
1987 – Cédric Baseya, French-Congolese footballer
  1987   – Karim Benzema, French footballer
  1987   – Ronan Farrow, American activist, journalist, and lawyer
1988 – Alexis Sánchez, Chilean footballer
  1988   – Peter Winn, English footballer
  1988   – Casey Burgess, Australian television personality
1989 – Yong Jun-hyung, South Korean singer-songwriter, rapper and producer 
  1989   – Michał Masłowski, Polish footballer
  1989   – Kousei Miura, Japanese jockey
  1989   – Hamza Riazuddin, English cricketer
1990 – Torrey Craig, American basketball player
  1990   – Greg Bretz, American snowboarder
1991 – Steven Berghuis, Dutch footballer
  1991   – Declan Galbraith, English singer-songwriter
  1991   – Sumire Uesaka, Japanese voice actress and singer
1992 – Iker Muniain, Spanish footballer
  1992   – Raphael Spiegel, Swiss footballer
1993 – Isiah Koech, Kenyan runner
  1993   – Young K, South Korean singer-songwriter
1994 – Maudy Ayunda, Indonesian actress and singer-songwriter
  1994   – M'Baye Niang, French footballer
  1994   – Colin Sinclair, North Mariana Islander tennis player
1996 – Franck Kessié, Ivorian footballer
2001 – Nicolas Checa, American chess player

Deaths

Pre-1600
 401 – Pope Anastasius I
 966 – Sancho I, king of León
1091 – Adelaide of Susa, margravine of Turin
1111 – Al-Ghazali, Persian jurist, philosopher, theologian, and mystic (b. 1058)
1123 – Saint Berardo, Italian bishop and saint
1327 – Agnes of France, Duchess of Burgundy (b. 1260)
1370 – Pope Urban V (b. 1310)
1442 – Elizabeth of Luxembourg (b. 1409)
1385 – Bernabò Visconti, Lord of Milan (b. 1319)
1558 – Cornelius Grapheus, Flemish writer (b. 1482)

1601–1900
1637 – Christina of Lorraine, Grand Duchess consort of Tuscany (b. 1565)
1741 – Vitus Bering, Dutch explorer (b. 1681)
1745 – Jean-Baptiste van Loo, French painter (b. 1684)
1749 – Francesco Antonio Bonporti, Italian priest and composer (b. 1672)
1807 – Friedrich Melchior, Baron von Grimm, German-French author and playwright (b. 1723)
1813 – James McGill, Scottish-Canadian businessman and philanthropist, founded McGill University (b. 1744)
1819 – Thomas Fremantle, English admiral and politician (b. 1765)
1848 – Emily Brontë, English novelist and poet (b. 1818)
1851 – Joseph Mallord William Turner, English painter (b. 1775)
1878 – Bayard Taylor, American author and poet (b. 1825)
1899 – Henry Ware Lawton, American general (b. 1843)

1901–present
1915 – Alois Alzheimer, German psychiatrist and neuropathologist (b. 1864)
1916 – Thibaw Min, Burmese king (b. 1859)
1927 – Ashfaqulla Khan, Indian activist (b. 1900)
  1927   – Ram Prasad Bismil, Indian poet and activist (b. 1897)
1932 – Yun Bong-gil, South Korean activist (b. 1908)
1933 – George Jackson Churchward, English engineer and businessman (b. 1857)
1938 – Stephen Warfield Gambrill, American lawyer and politician (b. 1873)
1940 – Kyösti Kallio, Finnish politician, the 4th President of Finland (b. 1873)
1944 – Abbas II of Egypt (b. 1874)
  1944   – Rudolph Karstadt, German businessman (b. 1856)
1946 – Paul Langevin, French physicist and academic (b. 1872)
1953 – Robert Andrews Millikan, American physicist and eugenicist, Nobel Prize laureate (b. 1868)
1968 – Norman Thomas, American minister and politician (b. 1884)
1972 – Ahmet Emin Yalman, Turkish journalist, author, and academic (b. 1888)
1976 – Giuseppe Caselli, Italian painter (b. 1893)
1982 – Dwight Macdonald, American philosopher, author, and critic (b. 1906)
1984 – Joy Ridderhof, American missionary (b. 1903)
1986 – V. C. Andrews, American author (b. 1923)
  1986   – Werner Dankwort, Russian-German colonel and diplomat (b. 1895)
1987 – August Mälk, Estonian author, playwright, and politician (b. 1900)
1988 – Robert Bernstein, American author and playwright (b. 1919)
1988 - Win Maw Oo, Burmese student activist (b. 1971)
1989 – Stella Gibbons, English journalist, author, and poet (b. 1902)
  1989   – Kirill Mazurov, Belarusian Soviet politician (b. 1914)
1993 – Michael Clarke, American drummer (b. 1946)
1996 – Marcello Mastroianni, Italian-French actor and singer (b. 1924)
1997 – Sara Northrup Hollister, American occultist (b. 1924)
  1997   – Masaru Ibuka, Japanese businessman, co-founded Sony (b. 1908)
  1997   – Jimmy Rogers, American singer-songwriter and guitarist (b. 1924)
1998 – Mel Fisher, American treasure hunter (b. 1922)
1999 – Desmond Llewelyn, Welsh soldier and actor (b. 1914)
2000 – Rob Buck, American guitarist and songwriter (b. 1958)
  2000   – Milt Hinton, American bassist and photographer (b. 1910)
  2000   – John Lindsay, American lawyer and politician, 103rd Mayor of New York City (b. 1921)
2002 – Will Hoy, English race car driver (b. 1952)
  2002   – Arthur Rowley, English footballer and manager (b. 1926)
  2002   – George Weller, American author, playwright, and journalist (b. 1907)
2003 – Peter Carter-Ruck, English lawyer, founded Carter-Ruck (b. 1914)
  2003   – Hope Lange, American actress (b. 1933)
2004 – Herbert C. Brown, English-American chemist and academic, Nobel Prize laureate (b. 1912)
  2004   – Renata Tebaldi, Italian soprano and actress (b. 1922)
2005 – Vincent Gigante, American mobster (b. 1927)
2008 – James Bevel, American minister and activist (b. 1936)
  2008   – Carol Chomsky, American linguist and educator (b. 1930)
  2008   – Michael Connell, American political consultant (b. 1963)
  2008   – Dock Ellis, American baseball player and coach (b. 1945)
2009 – Kim Peek, American megasavant (b. 1951)
2010 – Anthony Howard, English journalist and author (b. 1934)
2012 – Robert Bork, American lawyer, judge, and scholar, United States Attorney General (b. 1927)
  2012   – Amnon Lipkin-Shahak, Israeli general and politician, 22nd Transportation Minister of Israel (b. 1944)
  2012   – Larry Morris, American football player (b. 1933)
  2012   – Peter Struck, German lawyer and politician, 13th German Federal Minister of Defence (b. 1943)
2013 – Winton Dean, English musicologist and author (b. 1916)
  2013   – Al Goldstein, American publisher and pornographer (b. 1936)
  2013   – Ned Vizzini, American author and screenwriter (b. 1981)
2014 – S. Balasubramanian, Indian journalist and director (b. 1936)
  2014   – Philip Bradbourn, English lawyer and politician (b. 1951)
  2014   – Arthur Gardner, American actor and producer (b. 1910)
  2014   – Igor Rodionov, Russian general and politician, 3rd Russian Minister of Defence (b. 1936)
  2014   – Dick Thornton, American-Canadian football player and coach (b. 1939)
  2014   – Roberta Leigh (Rita Shulman Lewin), British writer, artist and TV producer (b. 1926).
2015 – Jimmy Hill, English footballer, manager, and sportscaster (b. 1928)
  2015   – Greville Janner, Baron Janner of Braunstone, Welsh-English lawyer and politician (b. 1928)
  2015   – Karin Söder, Swedish educator and politician, 33rd Swedish Minister for Foreign Affairs (b. 1928)
2016 – Andrei Karlov, Russian diplomat, Ambassador to Turkey (b. 1954)
2020 – Rosalind Knight, English actress (b. 1933)
2021 – Sally Ann Howes, English-American singer and actress (b. 1930)
  2021   – Johnny Isakson, American politician (b. 1944)

Holidays and observances
Christian feast day:
Lillian Trasher (Episcopal Church)
O Radix
Pope Anastasius I
Pope Urban V
December 19 (Eastern Orthodox liturgics)
Saint Nicholas Day
Goa Liberation Day (Goa, India)
National Heroes and Heroines Day (Anguilla)

References

External links

 BBC: On This Day
 
 Historical Events on December 19

Days of the year
December